Rajesh is an Indian actor who has performed in Tamil and Malayalam films and serials. He has completed more than 47 years in films and appeared as lead roles and supporting roles in over 150 films. He has done roles ranging from a hero to character actor.

Biography
Rajesh was born in 1949 to Williams Nattar and lily Grace Mankondar at Mannargudi, Tiruvarur district, but his family hails from Anaikkadu, in Thanjavur district. He studied in Dindigul, Vadamadurai, Melanatham Aanaikadu and Chinnamanur Theni district. After finishing his PUC in Karaikudi Alagappa College, he joined Pachaiappas College, but unfortunately did not complete his college education. He worked as a teacher in St Paul's High School, Purasawalkam and later at Kellett Higher Secondary School, Triplicane from 1972 to 1979.

In 1974, he got a chance to act in the film Aval Oru Thodar Kathai, but he only did a small role in it. His first film as a hero was Kanni Paruvathile (1979), produced by Rajkannu. Rajesh acted in Achamillai Achamillai, by K. Balachander. Later, he moved into playing character roles, and acted in movies with Kamal Haasan like Sathya, Mahanadhi and Virumandi.

Now he is into the hotel and real estate business and he is a leading builder in the city. He also wrote biographies of Hollywood actors in Tamil.

He is a Christian, later he was active in Periyaar's ideologies then he involved himself in Astrology. He had written many books and articles about Astrology.

Personal life
In 1983, he married Joan Sylvia Vanathirayar, who is the grand daughter of the famous social reformist and Dravidian leader Pattukottai Davis Vanathirayar. They have one daughter Divya and one son Deepak, who made his acting debut in 2014. His wife died on 6 August 2012.

He was the first Tamil actor to build a bungalow for the purpose of movie shooting in 1985 near KK Nagar, Chennai, which was inaugurated by the then Chief Minister M.G. Ramachandran. Many Tamil, Malayalam and Hindi movie shootings were completed in that house. He later sold it in 1993, while starting his real estate business. In the early 90s, as advised by his friend Jeppiaar, he started a Real Estate business, then he started hotel and construction business. He was active in politics from 1987 to 1991, supporting Janaki. He is also a follower of Karl Marx; he visited UK and paid his tribute to the great leader.

Filmography

As actor

As dubbing artist

Television

References

External links 
 
 
 Rajesh at Cinesouth
 

Male actors from Tamil Nadu
Indian male voice actors
Tamil male actors
Indian male film actors
Living people
1949 births
People from Thanjavur district
20th-century Indian male actors
21st-century Indian male actors
Male actors in Malayalam cinema
Male actors in Telugu cinema